Eshkaft-e Shiri (also Romanized as Eshkaft-e Shīrī; also known as Eshgaft-e Shīrī) is a village in Lishtar Rural District, in the Central District of Gachsaran County, Kohgiluyeh and Boyer-Ahmad Province, Iran. At the 2006 census, its population was 133, in 27 families.

References 

Populated places in Gachsaran County